East Malta Colony is a Hutterite community and census-designated place (CDP) in Phillips County, Montana, United States. It is in the eastern part of the county,  by road east of Malta, the county seat. It sits on high ground just west of Beaver Creek, a north-flowing tributary of the Milk River.

The community was first listed as a CDP prior to the 2020 census.

Demographics

References 

Census-designated places in Phillips County, Montana
Census-designated places in Montana
Hutterite communities in the United States